A coherent algebra is an algebra of complex square matrices that is closed under ordinary matrix multiplication, Schur product, transposition, and contains both the identity matrix  and the all-ones matrix .

Definitions 
 .
  for all .
A coherent algebra  is said to be:
 Homogeneous if every matrix in  has a constant diagonal.
 Commutative if  is commutative with respect to ordinary matrix multiplication.

Examples 
 The centralizer of a group of permutation matrices is a coherent algebra, i.e.  is a coherent algebra of order  if  for a group  of  permutation matrices.  Additionally, the centralizer of the group of permutation matrices representing the automorphism group of a graph  is homogeneous if and only if  is vertex-transitive.
 The span of the set of matrices relating pairs of elements lying in the same orbit of a diagonal action of a finite group on a finite set is a coherent algebra,   i.e.  where  is defined as for all  of a finite set  acted on by a finite group .

Properties 
 The intersection of a set of coherent algebras of order  is a coherent algebra.
 The symmetrization  of a commutative coherent algebra  is a coherent algebra.
 Every symmetric coherent algebra is commutative, and every commutative coherent algebra is homogeneous.
 A coherent algebra is commutative if and only if it is the Bose–Mesner algebra of a (commutative) association scheme.
 A coherent algebra forms a principal ideal ring under Schur product; moreover, a commutative coherent algebra forms a principal ideal ring under ordinary matrix multiplication as well.

See also 
 Association scheme
 Bose–Mesner algebra

References 

Algebra
Algebraic combinatorics